The flag of British Columbia is based upon the shield of the provincial arms of British Columbia.

History
From 1870 to 1906, British Columbia was occasionally represented by a modified British blue ensign featuring various forms of the great seal of the Colony of British Columbia.
The current flag of British Columbia was based upon the 1906 arms of the province, designed by Arthur John Beanlands, the canon of Christ Church Cathedral. Originally, the arms featured the Union Flag on the bottom. This was changed as it conflicted with the expression "The sun never sets on the British Empire." Based upon Beanlands' revised design, the flag of British Columbia was introduced on June 14, 1960, by Premier W. A. C. Bennett, and was first flown on board the BC Ferries motor vessel Sidney (later Queen of Sidney).

Design
The four wavy white and three wavy blue lines symbolize the province's location between the Pacific Ocean and the Rocky Mountains. The setting sun represents the fact that British Columbia is Canada's westernmost province. The image of the continuously rising sun refers to the provincial motto "splendor sine occasu" (“splendour without diminishment”)—suggesting the idea that the sun never sets (on the British Empire). The Union Flag on top reflects the province's British heritage, while the crown in the centre represents British Columbia becoming a Crown colony and achieving responsible government. The flag has an aspect ratio of 3:5.

A stylized version of the flag that appears on British Columbia licence plates incorrectly features the setting sun overlapping the Union Flag instead of the waves.

The flag of British Columbia is similar to the flag of the British Indian Ocean Territory. It also bears similarities to the arms of Suffolk County Council, the local authority of the county of Suffolk in the United Kingdom. As well as the flag of Kiribati, which features the blue waves for the Pacific Ocean and a sun for its own cultural reasons.

Gallery

See also

List of Canadian provincial and territorial symbols
Symbols of British Columbia

References

External links

 Arms and flag of British Columbia in the online Public Register of Arms, Flags and Badges
 British Columbia – The Flags of Canada, by Alistair B. Fraser

Flag
 
Flags of Canada
Flags with crosses
1906 introductions